Peverell is a neighbourhood of Plymouth in the English county of Devon.

Peverell may also refer to:

People
Andrew Peverell, MP for Sussex, 1351–1377
John Peverell (born 1941), English professional footballer
Nicky Peverell (born 1973), English footballer
Thomas Peverel or Peverell (died 1419), Bishop of Llandaff and Worcester
William Peverel or Peverell (c.1040–c.1115), Norman knight

Other uses
Peverell brothers, three brothers in the Harry Potter novels
Peverell Park, a cricket ground in Plymouth, Devon, England

See also
Peverel (disambiguation)